Melampsora pulcherrima is a Mediterranean plant pathogen. It is a rust that infects Mercurialis annua, causing galls, pycnia, and aecia over leaves and stem in winter, seen as a golden yellow swelling over several centimeters, as well as Populus alba, causing uredia and telia on leaves from spring until autumn.

References

External links
 Melampsora Pulcherrima in Plant Parasites of Europe: leafminers, galls and fungi
 Penetration and earlycolonization in basidiospore-derived infection ofMelampsora pulcherrima (Bub.)Maire on Mercurialis annua L.

Pucciniales
Fungi described in 1914
Fungi of Europe
Fungal plant pathogens and diseases
Taxa named by René Maire